Pain compliance is the use of painful stimulus to control or direct an organism. The stimulus can be manual (brute force, placing pressure on painful areas, or use of painful hyperextension or hyperflexion on joints), use tools such as a whip or electroshock weapon, or use chemicals such as tear gas or pepper spray.

The purpose of pain compliance is to direct the actions of the subject, and to this end, the pain is lessened or removed when compliance is achieved. This provides incentive to the subject to carry out the action required.

Use on humans
A common use in humans is as a law enforcement technique to assist with taking a suspect into custody, control a suspect in custody or encourage action on behalf of a person who is passively resisting. In disciplined law enforcement, the use of pain compliance forms part of a use of force continuum which will usually start with verbal warnings, before escalating measures.

Another common use of this technique is to physically compel chosen behavior, e.g. curbing school-yard bullying or racketeering, independent of any law enforcement process.

The pain stimulus can be manual, using a pain compliance hold or can be through the use of weapons such as an electroshock weapon (Taser) or ballistic round. Pain compliance as part of an escalation of force policy normally presumes a rational adversary, but some altered states such as mental illness, phencyclidine and amphetamine use, or extreme adrenaline may alter the subject's perception of pain or willingness to submit.

Like other forms of non-lethal force, such pain compliance strategies are not perfect and may be abused as a form of torture, with plausible deniability. For this reason the use of pain compliance is often subject to explicit rules of engagement designed to prevent abuse and avoid conflict escalation.

On other animals
Pain compliance is used as a training aid in animals, with physical aids including the use of whips and shock collars.

See also 
 Graduated Electronic Decelerator
 Judge Rotenberg Educational Center
 Physical restraint
 Torture

References 

Law enforcement techniques
Pain
Torture
Electroshock weapon controversies
Law enforcement controversies in the United States
Physical restraint
Police weapons
Coercion